Mani Madhava Chakyar: The Master at Work is a 1994 biographical film on the life and work of Māni Mādhava Chākyār, maestro of Kutiyattam. The film is directed by Kavalam Narayana Panicker and produced by Sangeet Natak Akademi, New Delhi.

See also
Māni Mādhava Chākyār
Manifestations of Shiva (film)
Kutiyattam

External links 
 

1994 films
Indian biographical films
1990s biographical films
1990s English-language films